Wild River is a 1960 American drama film directed by Elia Kazan, and starring Montgomery Clift, Lee Remick, Jo Van Fleet, Albert Salmi and Jay C. Flippen. It was filmed in the Tennessee Valley, and was adapted by Paul Osborn from two novels: Borden Deal's Dunbar's Cove and William Bradford Huie's Mud on the Stars, drawing for plot from Deal's story of a battle of wills between the nascent Tennessee Valley Authority and generations-old land owners, and from Huie's study of a rural Southern matriarchal family for characters and their reaction to destruction of their land, and the controversial employment of African-American laborers by the TVA. It marked Bruce Dern's film debut. The film was selected for National Film Registry by the Library of Congress in 2002.

Plot
In 1937, Chuck Glover (Montgomery Clift), the new head of the Tennessee Valley Authority's land purchasing office, arrives in Garthville, Tennessee, a town located upstream from a new hydroelectric dam. Glover is supervising the clearing of the land to be flooded. He first needs to acquire Garth Island on the Tennessee River. Elderly Ella Garth (Jo Van Fleet), matriarch of the large family that has lived on the island for decades, refuses to sell. To avoid bad publicity, the TVA wants to acquire the island without force.

Clearing the land is behind schedule because the mayor uses only white labor. Chuck goes to Garth Island, but Ella and the other Garth women, including Ella's granddaughter Carol Baldwin (Lee Remick), ignore him. Glover tries reasoning with Ella's three adult sons, Hamilton (Jay C. Flippen), Cal (James Westerfield), and Joe John, but relocating means them having to work for a living.

Chuck is forced to leave, but Hamilton later invites him back to speak with Ella. Chuck finds Ella criticizing President Franklin D. Roosevelt and his New Deal to her black farm hands and their families. Chuck stresses the benefits the dam will bring, but Ella denounces dams and the taming of rivers as going "against nature." Ella then shows Chuck the family cemetery on the island's highest point.

Chuck learns that Carol is a widow with two small children. She returned to the island after her husband died. She is expected to marry Walter Clark (Frank Overton), a businessman in town. Chuck advises her against marrying if she does not love him. Chuck talks to the farmhands about working for the TVA, reasoning their leaving the island will force Ella to sell. Carol invites Chuck to her former home off the island. They spend the night together and are soon falling in love.

The mayor opposes Chuck hiring "colored labor", saying it will cause problems with white workers. Chuck is urged to create segregated work gangs and pay black workers less. Chuck refuses despite receiving veiled threats. Carol and Chuck spend another night together, unaware that Walter Clark has seen them. The next morning Ella's workers and their families leave the island. Ella remains alone except for her field hand, Sam, who loyally refuses to go. Ella knows about Carol and Chuck. When Carol begs her grandmother to stay at her house, she orders her off the island.

R. J. Bailey (Albert Salmi), a cotton farmer whose black workers are quitting to work for the TVA, agrees to help scare Chuck from seeing Carol. Walter lures Chuck to his hotel room where Bailey is waiting. After Chuck treats him decently regarding their rivalry for Carol, Walter warns Chuck about Bailey. Bailey demands the government compensate him for workers who quit. When Chuck refuses, Bailey literally shakes him down for the money.

Chuck and Walter go to the island to see Ella. Chuck admits misunderstanding her fight to protect her dignity. The following day, Chuck learns that the dam's flood gates will be closed in a few days and Ella must be evicted immediately. Chuck rejects Hamilton and Cal's idea to have Ella declared legally incompetent so they can sell the land. He reluctantly asks the U.S. marshal to remove Ella the next day, then goes to the island in a final attempt to persuade her to voluntarily leave. She refuses.

Carol wants to go with Chuck when he moves on to a new assignment, though he is unsure. Walter arrives to warn them that Bailey and his men are coming to terrorize them. While the local sheriff stands aside, believing they are harmless, the thugs shoot out a window, overturn Chuck's car, and drive Walter's truck into the side of the house. Refusing to be driven off, Chuck confronts Bailey, but he is knocked out. The sheriff then runs off the gang.

Chuck and Carol marry. The next day, with Chuck and Carol present, Ella is evicted from the island as her former workers fell the trees. At her new home, Ella sits on the porch, refusing to speak. Soon after, Carol tells Chuck that Ella just died. Before leaving the valley, Chuck and Carol join her family and former workers to bury Ella in the family plot, the only part of Garth Island above water in the new lake.

Cast
 Montgomery Clift as Chuck Glover
 Lee Remick as Carol Garth Baldwin
 Jo Van Fleet as Ella Garth
 Albert Salmi as R.J. Bailey
 Jay C. Flippen as Hamilton Garth
 James Westerfield as Cal Garth
 Barbara Loden as Betty Jackson
 Frank Overton as Walter Clark
 Malcolm Atterbury as Sy Moore
 Bruce Dern as Jack Roper (uncredited)
 Robert Earl Jones as Sam Johnson (uncredited)

Production
Coon Denton Island on the Hiwassee River, in northern Bradley County, Tennessee, upriver from Charleston, served as the fictional Garth Island, and the city of Charleston's old business district served as the fictional city of Garthville. A peninsula northwest of Cleveland, Tennessee, on Chickamauga Lake, was used, and a studio for interior shooting was created in the Cleveland armory. A few other locations in rural Bradley County near Charleston were used.

Preservation
The film was preserved by the Academy Film Archive.

References

External links
 
 
 
 
 

1960 films
1960 drama films
20th Century Fox films
American drama films
Films based on American novels
Films based on multiple works
Films directed by Elia Kazan
Films scored by Kenyon Hopkins
Films set in Tennessee
Films set in the 1930s
Films set on fictional islands
Films shot in Tennessee
United States National Film Registry films
CinemaScope films
1960s English-language films
1960s American films